Dan Vidmar, best known by his stage name Shy Girls, is an American alternative R&B singer-songwriter and producer currently based in Portland, Oregon. His debut EP, Timeshare, was released in 2013 to critical acclaim on the Internet. Throughout 2014, Shy Girls was hand-picked as US tour opener for Haim, Maxwell, and Little Dragon and performed at festivals like Lollapalooza and MusicfestNW. Vidmar also was featured on "All We Need" by Odesza for their 2014 album, In Return. In 2015, he released a 13-track mixtape titled 4WZ which featured guest appearances by Tei Shi, Rome Fortune, Antwon, and Junglepussy. As a producer and songwriter, Vidmar has worked with artists such as Jhené Aiko, Young Thug, Cashmere Cat, Kito, Cyril Hahn, and Yoke Lore.

Life and career 
Vidmar was born in State College, Pennsylvania. He attended Pennsylvania State University where he majored in psychology and played classic rock music in a dive-bar before moving to Portland upon graduation.

Timeshare EP 
In 2013, Vidmar released his first single, "Under Attack", on SoundCloud. Pitchfork called the track "thrilling", "a devastating slow jam that knows just how long to withhold its pleasures" and Noisey named the track the 5th best song of 2013. Subsequently, his debut EP Timeshare was released in October of that year, garnering positive attention from many music publications and blogs.

Following the success of Timeshare, Shy Girls toured as the opening act for Haim on their 2014 US tour. Later that year he also went on to tour as the opening act for neo soul godfather Maxwell and Swedish electronic act Little Dragon.

4WZ Mixtape 
On February 4, 2015, Vidmar released a free 13-track mixtape, 4WZ, named after a radio station from his hometown. The mixtape featured appearances from Tei Shi, Rome Fortune, Antwon, and Junglepussy.

Salt and Bird on the Wing 
Vidmar's debut full-length album, Salt, was released on January 20, 2017. After a two year hiatus, he released the follow-up album, Bird on the Wing, in 2019 via the RCA imprint, Keep Cool.

Discography

Albums 
 Salt (2017)
 Bird on the Wing (2019)

EPs 
 Timeshare (2013)

Mixtapes 
 4WZ (2015)

Guest Appearances 
 2013: "Perfect Form" (Cyril Hahn ft. Shy Girls)
 2014: "All We Need" (Odesza ft. Shy Girls)
 2017: "The Future Comes Before" (Prequell ft. Shy Girls)
 2018: "Blue" (Kito ft. Shy Girls)

References

External links
 shygirlsmusic.com – Official website

Living people
American male singer-songwriters
American rhythm and blues singer-songwriters
Alternative R&B musicians
Musicians from Portland, Oregon
Year of birth missing (living people)
People from State College, Pennsylvania
Pennsylvania State University alumni
Singer-songwriters from Oregon